This is a list of census-designated places in New York. As of the 2020 census, New York had 699 census-designated places (CDPs).

Three sets of CDPs share the same name but are located in different counties:
 Fairview (Dutchess County) & Fairview (Westchester County),
 Greenville (Greene County) & Greenville (Westchester County)
 Milton (Saratoga County) & Milton (Ulster County)

See also 
 Administrative divisions of New York
 List of counties in New York
 List of cities in New York
 List of towns in New York
 List of villages in New York

References 

Census designated
New York